Ciner Media Group (Ciner Medya Grubu) is a Turkish media conglomerate established in 2007, part of the Ciner Holding conglomerate. Among other properties it owns the Habertürk newspaper, Habertürk TV and Habertürk Radyo, and the television stations Show TV, Show Türk and ShowMax TV. It co-owns the television station Bloomberg HT. It also publishes a range of magazines, including Turkish editions of international magazines such as FHM.

From 2005 to 2007 it owned Sabah; the newspaper was seized by the government's TMSF. From 2005 to 2007 it owned the ATV television station. It had previously operated both under license from Dinç Bilgin's Medya Group.

Ciner acquired the Habertürk properties in 2007 and Show TV in 2013.

References

External links
 Ciner Media Group
 TÜRK BASININDA MÜLKİYET VE SAHİPLİK YAPISI BAĞLAMINDA ÖZELLEŞTİRME UYGULAMALARI: CİNER MEDYA GRUBU

 
Conservatism in Turkey
Turkish companies established in 2007